The Negros Revolution, commemorated and popularly known as the Fifth of November or Negros Day, was a political movement that in 1898 created a government on Negros Island in the Philippines, ending Spanish control of the island and paving the way for a republican government run by the Negrense natives. The newly established Negros Republic lasted for approximately three months. American forces landed on the island unopposed on February 2, 1899, ending the island's independence. Negros was then annexed to the Philippine Islands on 20 April 1901.

Prelude to revolution
It has been stipulated that the Spanish civil and religious authorities in Negros did not initially suspect that the sugar barons and traders of the island would participate in an uprising against Spain.  The clergy in Negros had not acquired vast tracts of land, unlike their contemporaries on the island of Luzon. Negros had become a rich province and the local leaders were said to be "content, sharing even in many instances the social privileges of the Spanish elite."

Negros did not seem enthusiastic about the August 23, 1896 "Cry of Balintawak" and the subsequent revolt headed by the Tagalog Katipuneros.  Rather, it disapproved the same as battalions of volunteers were organized in Bais, Valladolid, La Carlota, and Isabela in order to defend the island. There had been, however, early on, attempts by various groups at the grassroots level to revolt against the Spanish colonizers. (See Dios Buhawi and Papa Isio)

However, a greater part of the sugar planters soon began to sympathize towards the proposed ends of the insurrection, until two years later, such sympathy bore fruit when these same sugar planters broke out in open revolt. By that time, Aniceto Lacson, a rich landlord of Talisay City had joined the Katipunan, and Juan Araneta, Rafael Ramos, Carlos Gemora, Venura, and other leaders of what would become the revolution of 1898 were negotiating with their comrades in Iloilo and were arming themselves.

By the middle of August 1898, as numerous rumors of a coming insurrection in the Visayas spread, a number of parish priests sought refuge in Iloilo City and in the then town of Jaro.

Chronicle of the revolt
Negrense revolutionaries in Iloilo agreed that the revolt would begin on November 3, 1898. It was to be led by Aniceto Lacson with Nicolás Gólez of Silay City as deputy commander. South of Bacolod, the revolt was to be led by Juan Araneta of Bago with Rafael Ramos of Himamaylan City as deputy commander.

November 3

Aniceto Lacson rode to Silay town. A committee headed by Lacson and acting for the province included Gólez, Leandro Locsin and Melecio Severino assembled and decided to begin the province-wide revolt on November 5. They then advised Juan Araneta of their decision to begin their revolution on the said day, and his approval was granted.

November 4
Juan Araneta, from one of his haciendas in Ma-ao, advised all the southern mayors to begin the revolt the following day. In the afternoon, a woman from Kabankalan Norte (the present-day barrio of Eustaquio López) in Silay told priest Tomás Cornago of the impending revolt, even though the planning for the same was held secretly. He inquired of his friend, Doroteo Quillama, cabeza of the barrio, seeking to verify the report. The cabeza claimed no knowledge of the revolt. That same afternoon, groups of armed men passed the haciendas of Silay, and proceeded towards the town. The guardia civil in Silay were, however, unable to report this to Bacolod City; the rebels had cut the telegraph lines in Talisay the day before.

November 5
The revolt began in central and northern Negros in the morning and by the afternoon had spread to other towns such as San Miguel and Cadiz. In Silay, Lt. Maximiano Correa, commanding the Spanish garrison, had ten Spanish cazadores  (light infantry) and seven Filipino civil guards. They were entrenched inside the municipal building, but surrendered without a fight when they realized that the townspeople were determined to burn the building to the ground should there be resistance. The Silay parish priest, Eulogio Sáez, a businessman named Juan Viaplana, and José Ledesma persuaded the Spanish forces to lay down their arms, but in order to save face, the lieutenant had it appear in the official records that the capitulation was the result of a bloody battle with "dead and wounded littered all over the field of battle". Ten Mauser and seven Remington rifles were surrendered by the garrison. Later, a flag similar to the design of the Filipino flag embroidered by Olympia Severino, Perpetua Severino and Eutropia Yorac was hoisted by the victorious townspeople.

In Bacolod, the governor of the province, Isidro de Castro, sent a force of 25 cazadores and 16 civil guards to engage a swarm of rebels seen camping near the Matab-ang River. After a brief skirmish, they withdrew, leaving two of their number dead. The governor decided to make a stand in the Bacolod Convent (presently the Bishop's Palace, the rectory of the San Sebastian Cathedral), where hundreds of Spanish families had taken refuge. They waited for the attack, but it did not come.

6 November

In the morning, the rebels advanced upon Bacolod. Lacson and Gólez approached from the north, crossing the Mandalagan River. Araneta with a thousand bolo-men took positions at the Lupit River in the south-east of Bacolod. The wily revolutionaries augmented their lightly armed forces with "cannon" made of bamboo and rolled amakan, and "rifles" carved out of wood and coconut fronds. The bluff worked; de Castro was persuaded that it was useless to defend the capital.

José Ruiz de Luzuriaga, a rich businessman who was deemed acceptable to both rebels and Spanish authorities was sent to mediate. At noon, a delegation from each of the major belligerents met at the house of Luzuriaga. The rebel delegation included Lacson, Araneta, Gólez, Locsín, Simeón Lizares, Julio Díaz, and José Montilla. In an hour, it was agreed by both sides that "Spanish troops both European and native surrendered the town and its defenses unconditionally, turning over arms and communication" and that  "public funds would be turned over to the new government".

November 6, 1898,  therefore, is the day that the revolution in Negros concluded.

The Spanish signatories of the surrender document included Isidro de Castro, Braulio Sanz, Manuel Abenza, Ramón Armada, Emilio Monasterio and Domingo Ureta. Those who signed for the Negros revolutionary forces were Aniceto Lacson, Juan Araneta, Leandro Locsin, Simeón Lizares, Julio Díaz, and José Montilla.

Forty-seven eminent Negrenses formulated and ratified a constitution to create a new republic. Signatories included among others Aniceto Lacson, Juan Araneta, Simeón Lizares, Antonio L. Jayme, Eusebio Luzuriaga, Nicolas Gólez, Agustín Amenabar, Rafael Ramos and Rosendo Lacson.

17–24 November 
On November 17, Governor Antionio Ferrer requisitioned the SS Bais, a ship which was sent by the Recollect Prior of Cebu to evacuate all the priests and put that vessel at the service of all Spaniards who wanted to live the province. On the same day, from Hacienda Vallehermoso, Negrense forces under the command of Gen. de la Vina began a week-long march to Dumaguete which took them about a week.

As Gen. de la Vina and his forces neared Sibulan in the late afternoon of November 23, his compadre, Lieutenant Cornelio Yapsutco came to break the news that the Spaniards left Dumaguete.

On November 24, Dumaguete was captured by Negrense forces with the support of the local population, thereby liberating Negros Oriental, and consequently all of Negros, from Spanish rule.

Impact
The revolution not only resulted in the establishment of the Republic of Negros, but also laid a firm foundation for both the Negros Island Region, albeit excluding Siquijor, which once formed part of Negros Oriental, and a future federal region.

Commemoration
 The Cinco de Noviembre memorial in Silay City includes an authentic Spanish colonial-era cannon donated by Claudio G. Akol Jr.
 November 5 was  declared by President Corazon Aquino as a special non-working holiday in the province through Republic Act No. 6709 signed  on February 10, 1989.

See also
Antonio Ledesma Jayme
Bacolod
Dios Buhawi
Papa Isio
Philippine Revolution

Notes and references

Philippine Revolution
Visayan history
History of Negros Occidental
History of Negros Oriental